A by-election was be held in the Tongan electorate of Haʻapai 12 on 1 September 2022. The by-election was triggered by the death of MP Viliami Hingano on 10 June 2022. Five candidates contested the by-election: former MP Moʻale Finau, Saimone Kapetaua Vuki, Sione Finau Tapu, Tevita Tu’ipulotu Vi and Tevita Vaikona.

The by-election was won by Moʻale Finau.

References

By-election
By-elections to the Legislative Assembly of Tonga
Tonga
Tonga
Haʻapai